Semirossia patagonica is a species of bobtail squid native to the southwestern Atlantic Ocean and southeastern Pacific Ocean; it occurs around the southern part of South America and has been recorded from waters off Chile, Anegada Bay, Tierra del Fuego, Argentina, and the Falkland Islands.

The type specimen measures 21 mm in mantle length (given as "Length of body 21 millims.").

The type specimen was collected off Patagonia, Argentina and is deposited at The Natural History Museum in London.

References

External links 

Bobtail squid
Cephalopods described in 1881